Tripura Gramin Bank (TGB)  is a Regional Rural Bank established on 21 December 1976 in terms of the provisions under the Regional Rural Banks Act 1976. The bank is sponsored by Punjab National Bank and is owned by Government of India (50% of Share Capital Deposit), Govt. of Tripura (15% of Share Capital Deposit) and Punjab National Bank (35% of Share Capital Deposit). TGB has total number of 154 operating branches in Eight District in Tripura. It is under the ownership of Ministry of Finance , Government of India.  

The shareholders of the Bank are Government of India (50%), Punjab National Bank (35%) and Government of Tripura (15%). The Bank is operating in eight districts of Tripura State with its Head Office at Agartala. The bank has three Regional Offices functioning at Agartala (West Tripura), Udaipur (South Tripura) and Kailashahar (North Tripura).

History
The bank was established on 21.12.1976 with only four branches (Agartala, Bishramganj, Bishalgarh & Jolaibari). However, presently it has grown to a network of 154 branches operating in eight districts in the State. 
In 2010, the bank launched its Core Banking Solution. ATM facility has now been extended to almost all branches & bank has launched Mobile Banking service in 4 May 2018.

Vision
Vision of Tripura Gramin Bank is to emerge as a customer-centric, techno-savvy based on overall business and profitability without sacrificing the rural essence. As having largest branch network in Tripura, it is endeavor to provide prompt service to rural masses of the state. To uplift the large rural denied and deprived masses by extending priority sector short term credit in the form of KCC, GCC, JLG, MSME with special thrust to agriculture sector. By increasing value added services to its customer Tripura Gramin Bank is all set to increase its profitability. Rural artisans, unemployed youth, skilled labour, farmers are the major areas where bank is focusing for their betterment. Next is to earn the fidelity of employees, customer and the community, by operating with integrity and fairness at all times and to satisfy the customer's needs by offering a myriad of products that are driven by a sales and service philosophy.

Branches

See also

 Banking in India
 Indian Financial System Code
 List of banks in India
 List of companies of India
 List of largest banks
 Make in India
 Regional Rural Bank
 Reserve Bank of India

References

Regional rural banks of India
Banks established in 1976
Companies based in Tripura
1976 establishments in Tripura
Indian companies established in 1976